Cullen Hightower (1923 – November 27, 2008) was a well-known quotation and quip writer from the United States. He is often associated with the American conservative political movement.

Hightower served in the U.S. army during World War II before beginning a career in sales. He began to publish his writing upon retirement. A collection of his quotations was published as Cullen Hightower's Wit Kit.  One of Hightower's most notable quotations is "People seldom become famous for what they say until after they are famous for what they've done."  Ironically, Hightower became famous for what he said rather than for what he did. A number of other quotes are in his obituary.

References

American humorists
1923 births
2008 deaths
United States Army personnel of World War II